Kamora may refer to:
 Kamora (brand), a brand of coffee liqueur produced in Mexico.
 Kamora (diacritic), a diacritical mark used in Old Cyrillic script.
 Kahmora Hall, American drag queen